Maxwell Miller may refer to:

Maxwell Miller (politician)  (1832–1867), journalist and politician in colonial Tasmania 
Edward Maxwell Miller (1911–1985), or Max Miller, American jazz pianist
J. Maxwell Miller, American sculptor

See also
 Max Miller (disambiguation)